Iberoporus is a genus of beetles in the family Dytiscidae, the only two known species in the genus, Iberoporus cermenius and Iberoporus pluto are endemic to the Iberian Peninsula.

References

Dytiscidae
Endemic insects of the Iberian Peninsula